Belleau Woods is a neighborhood in southeastern Lexington, Kentucky, United States. Its boundaries are Man o' War Boulevard to the south, Hickman Creek to the north and east, and a combination of Belleau Woods Drive and Greenfield Drive to the west. This neighborhood features a volunteer neighborhood association, the Belleau Wood Neighborhood Association.

Neighborhood statistics

 Area: 
 Population: 2,029
 Population density: 4,079 people per square mile
 Median household income: $41,189

References

Neighborhoods in Lexington, Kentucky